George Hugh Holden (15 April 1889 – 21 July 1959) was an Australian rules footballer who played for Fitzroy in the Victorian Football League (VFL).

Holden was both a centreman and wingman during his career with Fitzroy, which began in 1908. He was club champion in his debut season, winning the best and fairest award for the second time in 1915. One of Fitzroy's best in their 1913 premiership, Holden was named as the club's coach three years later and was a premiership player again in his first year in the role. He also captained the club in 1917 and 1918 while remaining coach but had to retire at the start of the 1919 season after suffering a serious knee injury.

References

External links

 
 
George Holden's playing statistics from The VFA Project

1889 births
Australian rules footballers from Melbourne
Mitchell Medal winners
Fitzroy Football Club coaches
Fitzroy Football Club Premiership coaches
Fitzroy Football Club players
Fitzroy Football Club Premiership players
West Melbourne Football Club players
1959 deaths
Two-time VFL/AFL Premiership players
One-time VFL/AFL Premiership coaches
People from Fitzroy, Victoria